Austin Michael Romero (born October 9, 1981) is an American television host, ring announcer and backstage interviewer. He is signed to WWE under the ring name Mike Rome, where he is the current ring announcer of Raw. He is a one-time WWE 24/7 Champion, holding the title for nine seconds.

Early life 
Rome grew up in San Diego, California as a huge fan of WWE's Rock 'n Wrestling era, idolizing Superstars like The Ultimate Warrior and being mesmerized by The Undertaker's debut at Survivor Series 1990.

Career 
Romero signed with WWE in May 2016, having previously worked for Nickelodeon as a touring emcee, and for Walt Disney World and Universal Studios in Orlando, Florida, as a cast member.  He began working as a ring announcer for the NXT brand on its Florida loop. He was also the ring announcer at the Cruiserweight Classic, and made his debut on WWE programming on the September 7, 2016, episode of NXT. His ring name is a shortened version of his middle name and his surname, and he initially went by his full middle name and the shortened version of his surname, before it was changed before a NXT taping to differentiate himself from Michael Cole. Rome would make his main roster debut on the January 16, 2017, episode of Raw, in a backstage segment interviewing Nia Jax. He would continue to make appearances on both NXT and Raw, with his final NXT appearance as an interviewer at NXT TakeOver: Brooklyn 4. From then on, Rome would be exclusive only to Raw, though occasionally appears on SmackDown.

Rome has occasionally been used on Raw or otherwise to further storylines. In an backstage segment in July 2018, Alexa Bliss was promoting Table for 3 on the WWE Network, when Rome walked by and interrupted her, thinking she was asking him out on a date. As part of WWE's online content, Rome would portray a delusional character who was sure he would be having dinner with Bliss. Beginning in April 2019, Rome, much like his SmackDown counterpart Greg Hamilton, was forced by Shane McMahon to introduce him to the ring with emphasis on the phrase "best in the world" (relating to McMahon's gimmick at the time). On one occasion, Rome's voice gave out towards the end, resulting in McMahon and Roman Reigns visibly laughing, as well as Michael Cole and Corey Graves making fun of him. According to Hamilton, Rome was legitimately sick that night, and later commended him for still pulling off the announcement.

On December 27, Rome won the WWE 24/7 Championship at a WWE Live event in Pittsburgh, Pennsylvania. Samir Singh had just won the title off R-Truth for his third reign, and wanted Rome to announce him as the new champion, prodding him as he did so. Instead, Rome rolled Samir up to win the title and was about to announce himself as the new champion, before Sunil Singh surprised him with a roll up to regain the title, also for his third reign.

Following the release of Greg Hamilton in October 2021, he had been announcing on both Raw and SmackDown until January 14, 2022 when Samantha Irvin was called up to the main roster from 205 Live to serve as the ring announcer for SmackDown.

Championships and accomplishments 
 WWE
 WWE 24/7 Championship (1 time)

References

External links 

1981 births
Living people
WWE 24/7 Champions
People from San Diego
Professional wrestling announcers